Chiang Mai station (SRT Code: CGM) ( (ชม.)) is a 1st class station and the main railway station in Chiang Mai Province. This station is on the east side of the Ping River in the city of Chiang Mai. There are 10 daily trains, not including Eastern and Oriental Express trains servicing this station. There are also four to six special trains for New Year, Songkran and other special festivals. In the 2004 census, Chiang Mai station served nearly 800,000 passengers.

Brief history
Chiang Mai station opened for service for standard gauge rolling stock on January 1, 1922. The first train was the Lampang–Chiang Mai mixed train.  An additional train was the Lamphun–Chiang Mai mixed train (Which later became the second Lampang–Chiang Mai mixed train), introduced on January 15, 1922.

Northern Express had been introduced to Chiang Mai on November 1, 1922. Northern Express using Baldwin Pacific locomotives (meter gauge) and Swiss Consolidation locomotives (meter gauge) was introduced on December 21, 1926. Later, Hanomag Pacific locomotive replaced Baldwin Pacific in 1928–1929.

Frich diesel electric locomotives replaced steam locomotives for the Northern express on March 5, 1933, after a test run on November 16, 1931.  The excursion train from Bangkok to Chiang Mai was also introduced on April 11, 1933.

The first Chiang Mai station building was destroyed by bombs from Allied forces on December 21, 1943. It was rebuilt in 1945 and reopened in 1948 and Northern Express service was resumed on August 4, 1946.

Train services
The following trains serve this station:
 Special Express 7/8 Krung Thep Aphiwat–Chiang Mai–Krung Thep Aphiwat
 Special Express "Uttarawithi" 9/10 Krung Thep Aphiwat–Chiang Mai–Krung Thep Aphiwat
 Special Express 13/14 Krung Thep Aphiwat–Chiang Mai–Krung Thep Aphiwat
 Express 51/52 Krung Thep Aphiwat–Chiang Mai–Krung Thep Aphiwat
 Rapid 109/102 Krung Thep Aphiwat–Chiang Mai–Krung Thep Aphiwat
 Local 407/408 Nakhon Sawan–Chiang Mai–Nakhon Sawan

References
 
 

Buildings and structures in Chiang Mai
Railway stations in Thailand
Railway stations opened in 1922
1920s in Chiang Mai